Mary Belle Brown, M.D. (March 1, 1846July 13, 1924) was an American physician and surgeon,  one of the few women in medicine of her time who practiced surgery.  She was professor and dean of the New York Medical College and Hospital for Women.

Early life and family

M. Belle Brown was born in Staunton Township, Miami County, Ohio, on March 1, 1848. Her father, Daniel Brown (1809–1877), was born in Rhode Island and went west in 1828. The genealogy of that branch of the Brown family of which she was a member was notable. He was the son of Arnold Brown and his grandfather was Reverend Chad Brown, a co-founder of Providence Plantations. Chad Brown emigrated from England in the ship "Martin," which arrived in Boston, MA, in July 1638. He went to Providence, Rhode Island, in the year of his arrival. He was one of a committee of four to prepare the first written form of government adopted and continued in force until 1644, when Roger Williams returned from England with the charter and Chad Brown was the first one of the thirty-nine who signed that charter. In 1642 he was ordained the first settled pastor of the Baptist Church. His great grandsons. John and James, repurchased a part of the land that had originally belonged to him and presented it to the college of Rhode Island. In 1770 the corner-stone of University Hall was laid by John Brown. In 1804 the name of that institution was changed to Brown University. M. Belle Brown's mother's name was Telford, and her ancestors were of the Jennings family from England. She was the daughter of Andrew Telford, a pioneer of Miami county. From her mother, Eliza Telford (1816–1899), who was the neighborhood doctor in an emergency and kept salves and liniments for everybody who desired them, she inherited her taste for medicine. Brown had 5 siblings: Cyrus Telford (1844–1914), Cornelia J. (1844–1907), Rebecca, Arnold O. (1852–1928) and Harry W. (1860–1917).

Brown was educated in the public schools in Troy, Ohio, and then at the Oxford Female College, Oxford, Ohio.

Career

Brown started the study of medicine in 1874. In 1876 she went to New York and entered the New York Medical College and Hospital for Women. She was graduated in 1879 and entered immediately upon a general practice in West 34th street, New York. Not much later she moved to 30 West 51st street, where she practiced from 1890 until her retirement. During the earlier years her practice took her frequently to the poorer quarters of the metropolis.

She was one of the few women in medicine of her time who practiced surgery. She attended clinics in New York and Chicago, studying under noted surgeons. She made a specialty of diseases of women and was professor of diseases of women in the New York Medical College and Hospital for Women, and was also secretary of the faculty of that institution. She was later made the dean, succeeding in that post Dr. Clemence Sophia Harned Lozier, noted feminist activist and founder of the college.

She also discovered a remedy for mal-de-mere, or sea-sickness, and train-nausea, called "Ship-shape".

She was a member of the American Institute of Homeopathy, of the New York County Medical Society, a member of the consulting staff of the Memorial Hospital in Brooklyn, and of the New York Homeopathic Sanitarium Association.

Personal life
After 40 years of a career all spent in New York, in 1917 M. Elle Brown retired to Troy, Ohio.

During World War I Brown was intensely active in raising funds for the American Hospital of Paris, as well as for the Red Cross.

Brown died on July 13, 1924, in Troy and is buried at Riverside Cemetery, Troy, Section 3, Lot 118, with her family.

References

External links
 

1846 births
1924 deaths
Physicians from New York City
Physicians from Ohio
20th-century American physicians
People from Miami County, Ohio
New York Medical College alumni
20th-century American women physicians
19th-century American women physicians
19th-century American physicians
Wikipedia articles incorporating text from A Woman of the Century